Komi Lje (Ԉ ԉ; italics: Ԉ ԉ) is a letter of the Molodtsov alphabet, a variant of Cyrillic. It was used only in the writing of the Komi language. It is equivalent to the Cyrillic letter Lje (Љ љ). Some of its forms are similar to the Chinese character 几.

Computing codes

See also 
Л л : Cyrillic letter El
Cyrillic characters in Unicode
Љ

Komi language
Cyrillic letters
Permic languages